The Apache Portable Runtime (APR) is a supporting library for the Apache web server. It provides a set of APIs that map to the underlying operating system (OS). Where the OS does not support a particular function, APR will provide an emulation. Thus programmers can use the APR to make a program truly portable across platforms.

APR originally formed a part of Apache HTTP Server, but the Apache Software Foundation spun it off into a separate project. Other applications can use it to achieve platform independence.

Functionality 
The range of platform-independent functionality provided by APR includes:
 Memory allocation and memory pool functionality
 Atomic operations
 Dynamic library handling
 File I/O
 Command-argument parsing
 Locking
 Hash tables and arrays
 Mmap functionality
 Network sockets and protocols
 Thread, process and mutex functionality
 Shared memory functionality
 Skip list functionality
 Time routines
 User and group ID services

Similar projects 
 GLib – provides similar functionality. It supports many more data structures and OS-independent functions, but fewer IPC-related functions. (GLib lacks local and global locking and shared-memory management.)
 Netscape Portable Runtime (NSPR) is a cross-platform abstraction library used by the Mozilla project. It is used by another subproject of Mozilla application framework (XPFE) to provide cross-platform graphical user interface (GUI) functionality.
 Adaptive Communication Environment (ACE) is an object-oriented library written in C++ similar in functionality to APR. It is widely deployed in commercial products.
 commonc++ is a cross-platform C++ class library for systems programming, with much of the same functionality as APR.
 POCO is a modern C++ framework similar in concept but more extensive than APR.
 WxWidgets is an object-oriented cross-platform GUI library that also provides abstraction classes for database communication, IPC and networking functionality.
 KDE Frameworks – used by KDE SC

References

External links 

 

Portable Runtime
C (programming language) libraries
Free computer libraries
Free software programmed in C
Application programming interfaces
Software using the Apache license